Queen Victoria of the United Kingdom married Prince Albert of Saxe-Coburg and Gotha on 10 February 1840. She chose to wear a white wedding dress made from heavy silk satin, making her one of the first women to wear white for their wedding. The Honiton lace used for her wedding dress proved an important boost to Devon lace-making. Queen Victoria has been credited with starting the tradition of white weddings and white bridal gowns,  although she was not the first royal to be married in white.

Design
The lace was designed by William Dyce, head of the then Government School of Design (later known as the Royal College of Art), and mounted on a white satin dress made by Mary Bettans.

The plain, cream-colored satin gown was made from fabric woven in Spitalfields, east London, and trimmed with a deep flounce and trimmings of lace hand-made in Honiton and Beer, in Devon. This demonstrated support for English industry, particularly the cottage industry for lace. The handmade lace motifs were appliquéd onto cotton machine-made net. Orange blossoms, a symbol of fertility, also trimmed the dress and made up a wreath, which Victoria wore instead of a tiara over her veil. The veil, which matched the flounce of the dress, was four yards in length and 0.75 yards wide. Victoria's jewelry consisted of a necklace and earrings made of diamonds presented to her by the Sultan of Turkey, and a sapphire cluster brooch given to her by Albert a day earlier. The slippers she wore matched the white color of the dress. The train of the dress, carried by her bridesmaids, measured  in length.

Queen Victoria described her choice of dress in her journal thus: "I wore a white satin dress, with a deep flounce of Honiton lace, an imitation of an old design. My jewels were my Turkish diamond necklace & earrings & dear Albert's beautiful sapphire brooch."

After the wedding

Reenactments
While photography existed in 1840, the techniques were not yet fully developed. A series of photographs taken by Roger Fenton on 11 May 1854 of Victoria and Albert are often described as wedding or reenactment photographs, with the dress identified as her wedding dress. The Royal Collection has refuted these interpretations, stating that the images are the first photographs to show Victoria as a queen, rather than as a wife or mother, and that she and Albert are wearing court dress.

In 1847, Victoria commissioned Franz Xaver Winterhalter to paint a portrait of her wearing her wedding clothes as an anniversary present for Prince Albert. The portrait was also copied as an enamel miniature by John Haslem.

Queen Victoria's wedding lace
Victoria revisited the lace-makers to create the royal christening gown worn by her children, including Albert Edward (the future Edward VII). This gown was worn for the christening of all subsequent royal babies until the baptism of James, Viscount Severn in 2008, when a replica was used for the first time. As a mark of support for the Honiton industry, in addition to often wearing their lace on her and her children's clothes, Victoria insisted her daughters also order Honiton lace for their wedding dresses. Victoria also wore her wedding lace mounted on the dresses she wore to the christenings of her nine children (except for Albert Edward's, for which she wore her Garter robes). She also wore it to the weddings of two of her children, her eldest daughter, Victoria, in 1858, and her youngest son, Leopold, in 1882. Her youngest daughter, Princess Beatrice, was permitted to wear it as part of her wedding gown in 1885. Victoria also wore the lace to the wedding of her grandson George (the future George V) to Mary of Teck in 1893, and for her Diamond Jubilee official photograph in 1897. When Victoria died, she was buried with her wedding veil over her face. In 2012 it was reported that while the dress itself had been conserved and displayed at Kensington Palace that year, the lace was now too fragile to move from storage.

Influence
Wearing white was quickly adopted by wealthy, fashionable brides.  Less than a decade later, Godey's Lady's Book would incorrectly claim that white wedding gowns were an ancient custom reflecting a bride's virginity, writing "Custom has decided, from the earliest ages, that white is the most fitting hue, whatever may be the material. It is an emblem of the purity and innocence of girlhood, and the unsullied heart she now yields to the chosen one", even though white had been a distinctly uncommon choice for bridal gowns before Victoria's wedding and was not chosen by a majority of brides until decades later.  

Following the 2011 wedding of Prince William and Catherine Middleton, comparisons were drawn between the bride's white wedding dress and Queen Victoria's own.

See also
 List of individual dresses

References

External links

BBC audio slideshow featuring her wedding dress

Victoria Queen
1840s fashion
British royal attire
Victoria, Wedding
Queen Victoria